Domakonda is a village in the Kamareddy district of the Indian state of Telangana. It is located in Domakonda mandal.

References 

Villages in Nizamabad district